m-Xylene (meta-xylene)  is an aromatic hydrocarbon. It is one of the three isomers of dimethylbenzene known collectively as xylenes. The m- stands for meta-, indicating that the two methyl groups in m-xylene occupy positions 1 and 3 on a benzene ring. It is in the positions of the two methyl groups, their arene substitution pattern, that it differs from the other isomers, o-xylene and p-xylene.  All have the same chemical formula C6H4(CH3)2. All xylene isomers are colorless and highly flammable.

Production and use
Petroleum contains about 1 weight percent xylenes. The meta isomer can be isolated from a mix of xylenes by the partial sulfonation (to which other isomers are less prone) followed by removal of unsulfonated oils and steam distillation of the sulfonated product.

The major use of meta-xylene is in the production of isophthalic acid, which is used as a copolymerizing monomer to alter the properties of polyethylene terephthalate.  The conversion m-xylene to isophthalic acid entails catalytic oxidation.   meta-Xylene is also used as a raw material in the manufacture of 2,4- and 2,6-xylidine as well as a range of smaller-volume chemicals.  Ammoxidation gives isophthalonitrile.

Toxicity and exposure
Effects vary with animal and xylene isomer. Concerns with xylenes focus on narcotic effects.

See also
Tetrachloro-m-xylene

References

Alkylbenzenes
C2-Benzenes